The Stone Fleet was the colloquial name for the small coastal ships that carried crushed-stone construction aggregate ('blue metal')  to Sydney from the Illawarra ports of Kiama and Shellharbour and the nearby ocean jetties at Bombo and Bass Point. 

The coastal shipping trade carried on by these ships was known colloquially as the 'Stone Trade' or 'Blue Diamond Trade'. The trade ended finally in 2011.

The 'Stone Trade' or 'Blue Diamond Trade' 

The predominant bedrock in the Sydney metropolitan area is sedimentary rock—Hawkesbury Sandstone with some isolated areas of shale. Crushed stone was needed as aggregate for concrete, road making, and as ballast for railways and tramways. Sandstone and shale are totally unsuited to such purposes, which typically use crushed igneous rock. There are some intrusions of igneous rocks in the Sydney area, particularly at Prospect Hill and Hornsby, but these isolated outcrops, although later quarried, were insufficient to meet demand.

In the southern part of the Illawarra region, south from Sydney, there are extensive igneous rock formations—mainly basalt—stretching from north of Shellharbour to south of Kiama at Gerringong, and extending right to the coastline. Around Kiama, the formations—known as the Gerringong Volcanics—are the result of lava flows from the extinct collapsed volcanic vent known as Saddleback Mountain. It is by far the largest formation of igneous rocks relatively close to Sydney and was well situated to allow transport by sea. The South Coast railway line did not reach Shellharbour (Dunmore) and Bombo until 1887 and it took until 1893 to reach Kiama; by that time, shipping of 'blue metal' by sea was already well established.

After the railway reached the district, significant amounts of the quarried and crushed stone were sent by rail, and some quarries had their own sidings. Coastal shipping remained cost-competitive as a means of transport for many years and the coastal shipping trade in "blue metal" continued until 2011.

Another colloquial name for this trade, the 'Blue Diamond Trade' probably stems from the term 'Black Diamond' used to describe coal, with a similar analogy being applied to 'blue metal', as the quarried and crushed basalt was known colloquially.

The ports of the Stone Trade

Kiama (1881-1942) 

Kiama was a port of the 'Stone Trade' from around 1881, when the Pike's Hill quarry opened on the outskirts of the town.

The harbour at Kiama relies upon the natural shelter provided by Blowhole Point but is largely artificial. The Robertson Basin was excavated from solid rock between 1871 and 1876. The connection from Blowhole Point to the mainland—previously submerged at high-tide—was raised by adding rock excavated from the basin in 1871. It was also in 1871 that the first commercial shipment of crushed basalt—waste from the excavation of the basin—was made to Sydney. From 1881, there were two staithes for loading crushed stone at the Robertson Basin. From 1887, the port had the Kiama Light as a aid to navigation.

It was difficult for sailing ships to enter Kiama, with a following wind, and not collide with the basin walls or other vessels; this problem was partially solved by placing a heavy chain on the seafloor at the harbour entrance, which ships could use to decelerate by dragging an anchor over it. Ultimately, sail gave way completely to steam, ending the need for this unique method of shedding speed.

A narrow gauge (2-foot / 610mm) railway line ran from the quarries to the port, via Terralong Street, from 1914 until 1941. Hoppers and staithes for loading crushed stone were located on the eastern side of the Robertson Basin. Until 1936, a branch of the tramway, along Manning Street, also took stone to a set of staiths south of the Kiama railway station, where it was loaded onto wagons for transport by rail. The quarries at Kiama closed, in 1942, mainly due to 'Stone Fleet' ships being requisitioned by the navy.

Bombo 

Bombo was the site of an ocean jetty for the nearby headland quarry. The jetty was on the north side of Bombo Point. Bombo was more exposed to the weather than Kiama and a less reliable port as a result. Stone from the quarry was crushed and then carried in rail wagons onto the wharf, where it was loaded onto ships using any of three chutes. The crushers and jetty were capable of shipping 3,000 tones of crushed stone per week in 1885.

The jetty only operated from 1883 until 1889. The arrival of the railway in 1887 and the acquisition of the quarry by the NSW Government Railways in 1889 made the jetty redundant. Ships known to have used the jetty during its brief operational life included, Lass o' Gowrie, Resolute, and Civility

Shellharbour 

Blue metal was loaded at times at the small coastal-shipping port at Shellharbour, although it was better known as a port for agricultural products. It was a difficult port to navigate, used only by small craft—such as Paterson —and masters who had local knowledge. There was a small jetty there by the end of the  1850s. A larger jetty was constructed in the late 1860s. Although receiving some protection from Bass Point to the south and Cowrie Island to north, the Shellharbour jetty was exposed to heavy seas from the east or north-east.

An artificial harbour was constructed in the 1880s, with one breakwater running for 100 yards In a north-easterly direction and another to the south-east for 50 yards—from Cowrie Island—providing an entrance only 100 feet wide, with a depth of six feet of water. The breakwater was extended westward around 1899, to block completely the gap between Cowrie Island and the mainland.

The jetty ran from the south-east corner of the basin, for 50 yards to the north-east. There was only one berth on the north-west side of the jetty, with from five to seven feet of water at low tide. A 'swinging buoy' was used when berthing vessels that had to head north-east as they went alongside. There was also a smaller, high wharf on the northern side of the basin, near the site of the modern-day boat ramp.

Bass Point (near Shellharbour) 

A wooden jetty was constructed around 1880 at Bass Point—an area also known in those times as 'Long Point'—to load crushed stone from an adjacent quarry. It was damaged by storms in 1922 and repaired. The jetty closed during the Second World War and did not resume operation after the war. It survived until 1957, when it was damaged in bad weather; its remains were demolished in 1958.

The existing jetty and its loader were completed in 1973. It could load a ship at a rate of 900 tonnes per hour. Bass Point was the last port of the 'Stone Fleet', closing in 2011.

Sydney Harbour (Pyrmont, Woolloomooloo and Blackwattle Bay) 
In the early 20th Century, 'blue metal' was unloaded at Pyrmont, by gangs of men in a similar way to 'coal lumping'. This was dangerous work.

During the 1930s, Blue Metal and Gravel Company Pty Ltd had discharge hoppers at Woolloomooloo and 'blue metal' was unloaded there.

'Blue metal' was unloaded at wharves at the head of Blackwattle Bay in Sydney Harbour. From 1972, this facility has been owned by Hanson. In its last decade, Blackwattle Bay was unloading 380,000 tonnes of crushed stone per annum. Part of the facility, the concrete batching plant, was still operating in 2019, but ships no longer unloaded there. It has since been demolished to clear a part of the site of the new Sydney Fish Market redevelopment.

The ships 
In the earliest years of the coastal trade, the "Stone Fleet" ships were sailing vessels. These were quickly supplanted by small coal-fired steamers designed to carry bulk cargo. The steamers in the earlier years of the trade were relatively small, wooden ships, like Civility, built  in 1872, Dunmore, built in 1891—both from the Rock Davis shipyard—and Resolute, built in New Zealand in 1883. Kiltobranks, built in 1908 by the Rock Davis yard, was another wooden-hulled ship used in the trade. An exception was the iron-hulled Lass o' Gowrie, built in Scotland in 1878. These steamships were, in turn, superseded gradually, by somewhat larger steel-hulled vessels, from the 1910s onwards, although surviving wooden-hulled steamers, such as Dunmore and Belbowrie continued to carry crushed stone during the inter-war period. Some of the steamships such as the second Kiama—built in 1920—were capable of making a round trip, from Kiama to Sydney and return, in one day, 22 hours.

There was also a similar type of small bulk cargo ship, usually dedicated to carrying coal, known as a 'sixty-miler'. Some 'sixty miler' ships carried construction aggregate from time to time. 'Stone Fleet' ships would occasionally carry coal, as part of the coastal coal-carrying trade. Given the density of their cargo, 'Stone Fleet' ships were smaller and had relatively smaller holds than the typical 'sixty-miler' designed to carry coal.

The last ship of the 'Stone Fleet', the self-discharging bulk carrier MV Claudia, was much larger and faster than the earlier vessels. The ship had three separate holds and could handle three different materials in any one trip, with a total capacity of 3,800 tonnes.

Incidents and losses 
Over the years of the 'Stone Trade', many ships of the Stone Fleet were wrecked, involved in collisions with other ships, or foundered. 

Many sailing vessels were lost in the earlier period of the 'Stone Trade'

In 1881, the schooners Industry and Mary Peverley where both attempting to enter port at Kiama, with a strong north-east wind blowing. The Industry 'missed the chain', and ran into the stone wharf. Mary Peverley managed to drag a second anchor over the chain, narrowly avoiding collision with another schooner, Prima Donna. Prima Donna later foundered and capsized, in a squall off Bondi in 1882, with the loss of six of her seven crew.

In December 1883, Lass o' Gowrie, after running in ballast from Sydney to Bombo, struck a rock while standing off Bombo waiting for Civility to leave the jetty. Later, carrying stone from Bombo in 1885, she collided, at night, with the steamer Glaucus off Bradley's Head in Sydney Harbour. Both times, she was run aground to prevent her sinking.

The wooden-hull steamer Civility collided with Illawarra, off Kiama, in August 1881, You Yang in January 1886—after which she sank off Bradleys Head but was apparently refloated—and Vision in July 1902, surviving to be broken up in 1918.

In 1894, the small wooden steamer Resolute, out of Kiama, sprang a leak off Five Islands and was saved by being beached In Wollongong Harbour. She was refloated and her cargo of 'blue metal' offloaded at Wollongong. Also in 1894, the Bowra, a wooden steamer that had been put on the Kiama run in 1893 assisting the Resolute, also sprang a leak near Seal Rocks, while carrying coal to the Clarence from Newcastle, and foundered, without loss of life.

Not lucky for a second time, Resolute went aground on the notorious Bellambi Reef, in 1907, and broke up. There were no deaths, but the vessel was uninsured at the time. She had been in service since 1883.

The wooden-hull Dunmore had a narrow escape after she collided with a much larger ship, the 'sixty-miler' Kelloe, two miles off the Botany Bay heads in May 1902. The Kelloe sank within 15 minutes.  Dunmore picked up the Kelloe's crew and made it through the heads of Botany Bay, where she was only saved by being beached at Kurnell.

Dunmore collided with a naval longboat off Mrs Macquarie's Point in Sydney Harbour in 1909, resulting in the drowning of 15 sailors from HMS Encounter. Outbound from Sydney, Dunmore was involved in another collision, in 1914, off the Heads of Sydney Harbour; this time she collided with another 'Stone Fleet' ship, the steel-hull Kiama, which was inbound and fully-laden with crushed stone. Although Dunmore was left with a gaping hole in her bow, she remained afloat. In 1915, the Dunmore ran aground on a reef near Bradley's Head, but sustained little damage. In 1918, the Dunmore was involved in yet another collision—this time with the tug Champion—and sustained damage; a Court of Marine Inquiry found the Champion's master responsible.
in 1924, the wooden steamer Kiltobranks had just loaded 'blue metal' at Shellharbour but, upon leaving the wharf, she went aground nearby during a north-easterly gale. Her back broken and with large seas breaking over her, she was a total loss.
The small wooden twin-screw coastal steamer, Stone Fleet ship, and sometime sixty-miler, Belbowrie, had survived a grounding on a sandy bottom at Doughboy Point (east of Boat Harbour), in June 1923,  and a collision with a submerged object that holed her hull, in February 1931. 

In January 1939, Belbowrie was on her way south, to load a cargo of blue metal at Shellharbour. At night and with heavy rain reducing visibility, she ran straight onto rocks at a location, known as 'The Boulders', on the rock platform between the southern end of Maroubra Beach and the Malabar Headland. As she struck the rocks, she was hit by a wave that spun her around, so that her bow was left facing north. Her lifeboat was smashed. Members of the Maroubra Surf Life Saving Club rowed to the scene, in two surfboats, but could not approach the ship safely, due to the breaking waves. Her crew of ten all survived; they made their way to safety, one-by-one, hand-over-hand, suspended from a 70 foot long (21 m) rope line, while being drenched by the heavy rain and breaking surf. The tough old little ship then broke up, over the next two days. It seems that the south-east weather and waves had pushed her off course, too close to the coast, and onto the rocks.
In 1949, Bombo, carrying 'blue metal', was attempting to make for the safety of Port Kembla, when her list became so great that she rolled over and sank off the coast between Wollongong and Port Kembla. Twelve of the fourteen crew lost their lives; the two survivors and the ship's dog making it to shore, but a considerable distance north of the location at which the ship sank.

Paterson had a near miss, in 1949 during a storm off Wollongong, soon after she had replaced Bombo on the Kiama run. With her bunker coal wet due to waves breaking over the ship, it took her 46 hours to reach Sydney, after needing to take shelter in Botany Bay.

In 1951, the 'Stone Fleet' ship, Kiama, was carrying coal from Newcastle to Sydney, when she developed a serious list, during a gale that carried her onto the Tuggerah Reef—located offshore due east of Toowoon Bay. The crew took to lifeboats and rafts but were too close to the reef to be picked up safely by the CSR ship, Fiona, that was nearby. Kiama broke up and sank within a few minutes. Only six of the twelve crewmen survived by making it to shore.

The crew safely abandoned the ship and rowed ashore, in a boat, taking only their personal possessions with them. The location was not far from where Paterson had been beached and later refloated, after a similar incident, in November 1947, while carrying coal to Sydney, but this time it was the end of her.

In 1954, while the second 'Stone Fleet' ship known as Dunmore (MV Dunmore, formerly Nassau) was in Kiama Harbour, her engineer was badly burned when a diesel engine back-fired. He leapt into the water to extinquish his burning clothing but later died of his injuries.

Hexham Bank had survived her time carrying coal as a 'sixty-miler' but, in June 1978, while preparing to load crushed stone at Bass Point, she caught fire. All her crew were rescued. Her engine room was destroyed and she was deemed a "constructive loss" and scrapped. Her hulk later was later sunk off Sydney Heads.

Decline, revival, and end of the 'Stone Fleet'

Impact of the Second World War 
There was an interruption to the trade during the Second World War, when the Kiama, Dunmore, Paterson, and Bombo were requisitioned for wartime service. The quarries and narrow-gauge railway at Kiama closed permanently at this time. Around the same time, the Bass Point quarry and jetty also closed.

Bombo and Paterson were used as minesweepers during the war.

Loading at Bass Point did not resume after the war, and its disused jetty was destroyed in a storm in 1957.

Post-war operations at Kiama (1947-1961) 

After the war, the trade resumed but ground had been lost to road and rail transport. Kiama became, once again, a port for loading 'blue metal' but now it was brought from nearby quarries to the port by road transport.

Bombo, Paterson, and Kiama survived the war—Bombo was on the Kiama to Sydney run by the end of September 1947—but all three ships were lost in incidents in the following years; Bombo in 1949 and both the other ships in 1951. The fate of the original wooden-hulled SS Dunmore seems to be not recorded. A new steel-hulled MV Dunmore (ex-Nassau) entered service in 1951, with Kiama as its home port. There was another ship, still at work in 1959, MV Bass Point (ex-Betoeran), which—like MV Dunmore (ex-Nassau)—was formerly a Dutch East Indies oil tanker.

171,829 tons of gravel was shipped by sea from Kiama Harbour—vessels making 242 trips—during the 1956–57 financial year.

MV Dunmore took the last shipment of 'blue metal' from Kiama on 21 December 1961, then becoming redundant. She was sold (c. 1962–1963) and renamed Fijian Trader, under which name she ran aground and was wrecked in 1964. The hoppers at the Robertson Basin were demolished in 1965.

Reopening of Bass Point and final years (1973—2011) 

The Bass Point quarry reopened in 1973 using a new jetty and loader, referred to locally as 'the gravel loader'. Thus began what would be the final phase of the Stone Trade. With the older Stone Fleet ships all gone by then, the trade at the new Bass Point jetty used ex-'sixty-miler' colliers, like Hexham Bank, which were available after the end of gas production from coal.

The new operation at Bass Point and the use of a larger ship, MV Claudia, resulted in the last years of the trade achieving the highest shipments. Over 14 years, MV Claudia delivered over 2.8 million tonnes of aggregate to the Sydney. Three times a week, she made the return journey from Blackwattle Bay Concrete Plant to Bass Point, loading at the Bass Point Jetty, with 3,800 tonnes of crushed basalt carried by conveyors direct from the Bass Point Quarry. Each trip that MV Claudia made was the equivalent of 100 truck movements through the Sydney area.

MV Claudia was retired in 2011, finally ending the "Blue Diamond" or "Stone" coastal-shipping trade. She was sent to be scrapped in China. All transport from Bass Point is now by road.

Legacy and remnants 

None of the 'Stone Fleet' ships survive. Bombo and her crew are commemorated by two plaques near Kiama Harbour. Her wreck lies on the seabed near Port Kembla. There are still some remains of Paterson, in shallow water north of Norah Head, making it an easy dive.

The Robertson Basin at Kiama remains but is no longer a shipping port. Remnants of the narrow-gauge tramway once could be found in Terralong Street, Kiama, outside the Presbyterian Church and the locations of the loading bins at the basin can still be identified.  A Fowler locomotive, from the tramway, is under restoration at the Illawarra Light Railway Museum. A second locomotive, 'Kiama', also used on the quarry tramway, is preserved there in operational condition. The old Kiama quarry site straddles Terralong Street, beyond its intersection with Thomson Street in Kiama; it is now occupied by buildings, sporting fields, and open space.

The headland quarry at Bombo is now the Bombo Headland Quarry Geological Site, but nothing remains of its ocean jetty, except for some rock-filled parts at the land end of the former jetty's site. 

The harbour at Shellharbour is now used for recreational boating. The disused gravel loader, at nearby Bass Point, remains as part of the Bass Point Reserve. A little west of the gravel loader, a crumbling concrete ruin seems to be all that remains at the earlier ocean jetty's site.

A Hanson concrete batching plant remained at Blackwattle Bay in January 2020, at the site of the former unloading facility, but was no longer used by ships. Its site had been cleared completely, to make way for the new Sydney Fish Market, by November 2021.

The southern Illawarra has continued to be the main source of construction aggregate and ballast—for Sydney and much of New South Wales—for over 140 years. Although somewhat hidden from public view, the huge voids created by quarrying are apparent in aerial views.

See also 

 Sixty-miler
Fowler narrow-gauge locomotive from Kiama
'Kiama' (locomotive)

References

External links 

 Shellharbour City Museum - Bass Point Gravel Loader
United Divers - The Stone Fleet and the Blue Diamond Trade

Shipping in Australia
 
Kiama, New South Wales